Zantema can refer to 
 Hans Zantema (born 1956), Dutch mathematician and computer scientist
 Grytsje Kingma-Zantema (born 1964), Frisian singer